The 7th World Cup season began in December 1972 in France and concluded in March 1973 in the United States. Gustav Thöni of Italy won his third consecutive overall title and Annemarie Pröll of Austria won the women's overall title, her third of five consecutive.

Calendar

Men

Ladies

Men

Overall 

The Men's Overall World Cup 1972/73 was divided into three periods. From the first 5 races the best 3 results count, from the next 9 races (Race No 6 to No 14) the best 5 results count and from the last 10 races the best 6 results count. Two racers had a point deduction. Gustav Thöni won his third Overall World Cup in a row!

Downhill 

In Men's Downhill World Cup 1972/73 the best 5 results count.

Giant Slalom 

In Men's Giant Slalom World Cup 1972/73 the best 5 results count. In every race there was a different winner!

Slalom 

In Men's Slalom World Cup 1972/73 the best 5 results count.

Ladies

Overall 

The Women's Overall World Cup 1972/73 was most likely also divided into periods.

Downhill 

In Women's Downhill World Cup 1972/73 the best 5 results counted. Annemarie Pröll won all competitions and won the cup with maximum points. She won her third Downhill World Cup in a row. The Austrians won 21 out of 24 available podium-places. Only Jacqueline Rouvier from France was able to climb on the podium with them three times.

Giant Slalom 

In Women's Giant Slalom World Cup 1972/73 the best 5 results count.

Slalom 

In Women's Slalom World Cup 1972/73 the best 5 results count.

Nations Cup

Overall

Men

Ladies

References

External links
FIS-ski.com - World Cup standings - 1973

FIS Alpine Ski World Cup
World Cup
World Cup